Rhoda Constance Ryan (née Hawke; 4 January 1925 – 22 April 2002) was an international lawn bowls competitor for New Zealand.

Bowls career
Ryan won the singles bronze medal at the 1985 World Outdoor Bowls Championship in Melbourne, Australia. In 1990 she represented New Zealand at the Commonwealth Games and won a silver medal in the fours with Adrienne Lambert, Lyn McLean and Marlene Castle.

She won two medals at the Asia Pacific Bowls Championships including a gold medal in the 1985 pairs at Tweed Heads, New South Wales.

Ryan won the 1980 singles, the 1973 & 1988 pairs and the 1981, 1989, 1990, 1991 and 1994 fours titles at the New Zealand National Bowls Championships when bowling mainly for the Matamata Bowls Club  and over 50 club titles.

The eight times National Champion died in April 2002.

References

New Zealand female bowls players
1925 births
2002 deaths
Commonwealth Games medallists in lawn bowls
Commonwealth Games silver medallists for New Zealand
Bowls players at the 1990 Commonwealth Games
Medallists at the 1990 Commonwealth Games